Metin Oktay (2 February 1936 – 13 September 1991) nicknamed the Uncrowned King by Galatasaray fans, was a Turkish footballer and one of the most successful goal scorers in Turkey.

Early life
Metin Oktay was born in Karşıyaka, İzmir, on 2 February 1936. His father was a factory worker and his mother a homemaker.

Personal life
Metin Oktay married Servet Kardicali on 12 May 1965, in Istanbul. On 9 February 1965, the couple had a daughter who was named by Metin Oktay as "Zeynep". She died the same day she was born. In 1979, Metin and Servet Oktay had a granddaughter from their son Rifat Halil Pala who was named Zeynep Pala. Metin Oktay lived with his family; his spouse Servet Kardicali Oktay, his son Rifat and granddaughter Zeynep until he died on 13 September 1991 in Istanbul.

Career
Oktay started his career at his local amateur club, Damlacık, in 1952 and moved to another amateur side, Yün Mensucat, in the following season during which he made his first appearance for the junior national team in 1954. He was quickly transferred to İzmirspor at the end of the season and became the top scorer with 17 goals in the İzmir League the following season, the first of many times that he would lead the top scorers in the league. In 1955, Gündüz Kılıç, trainer and former footballer of Galatasaray transferred him. Oktay, then only 19 years old, signed a five-year contract with Galatasaray in exchange for a Chevrolet car. Despite his young age, he was the top scorer in his first season in the Istanbul League, with 19 goals, and his team Galatasaray won the championship. Oktay was top scorer for four seasons in the İstanbul League and then three more in the Turkish League, thus making it seven consecutive years in the competitions he played in.

Oktay made a record-breaking contract with Galatasaray in 1960 and because of this deal he had to divorce his wife Oya Sarı who wanted him to play for his old club İzmirspor. In December that year, he scored four goals (after 1, 9, 61 and 71 minutes) in a 5–0 victory against arch rivals Fenerbahçe which fixed his hero status among Galatasaray supporters. Songs were created for him and he became the first-ever Turkish footballer to play himself in a movie based on his life while actively pursuing his career.

Metin Oktay stayed with Galatasaray until 1969, with the exception of a short period in 1961–1962, when he played for Palermo in Italy. He was the most crowned (six times) top goalscorer in the Turkish League and set a record with 217 goals in total. Tanju Çolak broke his record of most goals in a season in 1988 by a margin of one goal. Nicknamed the Taçsız Kral or "King without a crown", he was a particularly strong goal scorer in Derby matches. During a Derby match against Galatasaray's archrivals Fenerbahçe in 1959, he hit the ball hard enough to open a hole in the opponents' goal net. This unforgettable shot was one of the 18 goals that Oktay scored against Fenerbahçe in his career. The other major Istanbul rivals, Beşiktaş let in 13 of his goals.

Oktay was also assistant coach and head coach of Galatasaray football team in the 1969–70 season and he later coached Bursaspor for a couple of years. Oktay was a board member of the club in 1984 for two years.

He played 36 times for the Turkish national team and scored 19 goals. Breaking almost every record in the history of Turkish football that stood at the time, the "King" retired in 1969. Oktay died on 13 September 1991 in Istanbul in a car accident.

Legacy

Turkish comics artist Abdullah Turhan once made a comic strip about Metin Okay, published in the magazine 1001 Roman and Fotomaç.

Every year on 13 September, Galatasaray players and supporters pay homage to the "Uncrowned King" at his grave in Kozlu cemetery near Topkapı in Istanbul.

Galatasaray's sports complex and training facility, the Metin Oktay Sports Complex and Training Center, located in Florya, Istanbul, is named after him.

Career statistics

International goals

Club level
A goals tally in bold indicates that Oktay was the competition's top scorer for that season.

Honours

Club
Galatasaray
Süper Lig: 1962–63, 1968–69
Turkish Cup: 1962–63, 1963–64, 1964–65, 1965–66
Turkish Super Cup: 1966, 1969
Istanbul Football League: 1955–56, 1957–58
TSYD Cup: 1963, 1966, 1967

Individual
Izmir Football League Top Scorer: 1954–55
Istanbul Football League Top Scorer: 1955–56, 1956–57, 1957–58, 1958–59
Gol Kralı (6): 1959, 1959–60, 1960–61, 1962–63, 1964–65, 1968–69 (record)(In 1968–69, both Metin Oktay and Fevzi Zemzem had 19 goals each. Zemzem asked for Oktay to have the trophy)
Most Süper Lig goals in a single season: 38 (1962–63)
Galatasaray All-Time Top Scorer: 352

See also
List of Galatasaray S.K. records and statistics

References

External links

Taçsız Kral

1936 births
1991 deaths
Turkish footballers
Turkish football managers
Turkey international footballers
Turkey youth international footballers
Turkish expatriate footballers
Turkish expatriate sportspeople in Italy
Footballers from İzmir
Bursaspor managers
Expatriate footballers in Italy
Galatasaray S.K. (football) managers
Galatasaray S.K. footballers
Serie A players
Süper Lig players
Süper Lig managers
Palermo F.C. players
Road incident deaths in Turkey
Association football forwards
Burials at Topkapı Cemetery